Melbourne tram route 64 is operated by Yarra Trams on the Melbourne tram network from Melbourne University to Brighton East. The 18.1 kilometre route is operated out of Glenhuntly depot with Z and B class trams.

After 19:00, passengers for route 5 to Malvern are required to board route 64 (marked 64/5) and transfer to route 5 shuttles on Dandenong Road.

History
Route 64 was allocated to the line between Brighton East and City (Swanston Street) on 16 October 1938. Prior to that, Route 64 was allocated to the line between Brighton East and St Kilda Beach via St Kilda Junction. Between 1938 and 9 July 1955, Route 64 ran via Balaclava Road rather than Dandenong Road. Trams traditionally terminated at the Victoria Street terminus, but following an accident in 1991, trams instead terminated at the Queensberry Street crossover. Due to congestion during peak hours at the crossover, some trams continued north to Melbourne University. Finally on 17 January 1996, a permanent shunt was built at Melbourne University. From then on, Route 64 trams were altered run full-time to Melbourne University.

The origins of route 5 lie in separate tram lines. The section of track between Queensberry Street (Stop 4) and St Kilda Road (Stop 30) is the oldest section of this route, dating back to the Brighton Road cable tram which opened on 11 October 1888 by the Melbourne Tramway & Omnibus Company. This cable tram line was electrified in stages by the Melbourne & Metropolitan Tramways Board (MMTB). The section between Domain Interchange (Stop 20) and St Kilda Junction (Stop 30) was electrified on 27 December 1925. The section between Queensberry Street and City Road (near Stop 14) was electrified on the same day. The line between City Road and Domain Interchange was electrified on 24 January 1926. The section between St Kilda Junction and Chapel Street (Stop 32) also dates back to the cable era, as the Windsor to St Kilda Esplanade cable tramway which opened on 17 October 1891. This section was one of the first cable trams to be converted to electric traction on 27 December 1925.

The Prahran & Malvern Tramways Trust built the section between the Sandringham railway line (near Stop 33) and Hawthorn Road (Stop 48), opening on 16 December 1911. This line was extended to Chapel Street (Stop 32) on 31 March 1912. The line between Hawthorn Road and Balaclava Road (Stop 51) opened on 12 April 1913. This was later extended to Glenhuntly Road (Stop 57) on 13 November 1913. Further extensions of the Hawthorn Road line were built by the MMTB to North Road (on 1 March 1925), and to Point Nepean Road on 5 December 1937.

As part of the St Kilda Junction separation works, the Wellington Street section was abandoned for a new section of track along the newly created Queens Way on 4 November 1968.

Operation
Route 64 is operated out of Glenhuntly depot with Z and B class trams.

Route map

References

External links

064
064
1938 establishments in Australia
Transport in the City of Bayside
Transport in the City of Glen Eira
Transport in the City of Stonnington
Transport in the City of Port Phillip